A sand island is an island made up of sand.

Sand Island is the name of several places including:

In the United States
Sand Island (Alabama)
Sand Island (Anguilla)
Sand Island (Hawaii) 
Sand Island (Kentucky / Falls of the Ohio)
Sand Island (Nevada)
Sand Island (Multnomah County, Oregon)
Sand Island (Washington)
Sand Island (Wisconsin), one of the Apostle Islands
Sand Island Light (Wisconsin)

In United States outlying islands
An islet in Johnston Atoll
An islet in Midway Atoll
An islet in Palmyra Atoll

See also
Sandy Island (disambiguation)
Sable Island (French: île de Sable, literally "island of sand"), a 31 km² canadian island situated about 175 km (109 mi) southeast of the closest point of mainland Nova Scotia in the North Atlantic Ocean 
Sand Islands in the South China Sea
Spratly Islands, the South Sand Islands
Paracel Islands, the West Sand Islands
Macclesfield Bank, the Middle Sand Islands